Wood High School may refer to:

 Archbishop Wood Catholic High School, Philadelphia, Pennsylvania
 Henry Wise Wood Senior High School, Calgary, Canada
 James Wood High School, Winchester, Virginia
 Nunnery Wood High School, Worcestershire, England
 Parrs Wood High School, East Didsbury, England
 Penn Wood High School, Lansdowne, Pennsylvania
 Waldo J. Wood Memorial Jr/Sr High School, Oakland City, Indiana
 Will C. Wood High School, Vacaville, California